The Texas House of Representatives 49th District represents a central portion Travis County. The current Representative is Gina Hinojosa, who has represented the district since 2017.

Following the 2021 redistricting, the district includes much of central Austin, including the Texas State Capitol Building and a stretch of Austin's historic Sixth Street entertainment and bar district. The district also encompasses the small city of Sunset Valley.

Major highway I-35 acts as an eastern border for much of the district, separating it from Texas House district 46.

References 

49